Baari is the local season of the reality The Bar in Finland. The show was started on 7 March 2006 and finished on 4 June 2006, with a duration of 90 days. Sub TV is the channel was aired. The presenters are Kirsi Salo & Silvia Modig.

Contestants

Nominations

References

Finnish reality television series
2006 Finnish television series debuts
2006 Finnish television series endings
2000s Finnish television series
Sub (TV channel) original programming